Doramba is a Rural municipality located within the Ramechhap District of the Bagmati Province of Nepal.
The municipality spans  of area, with a total population of 22,738 according to a 2011 Nepal census.

On March 10, 2017, the Government of Nepal restructured the local level bodies into 753 new local level structures.
The previous Dadhuwa, Doramba, Tokarpur, Goshwara, Gunsi Bhadaure and Lakhanpur VDCs were merged to form Doramba Rural Municipality.
Doramba is divided into 7 wards, with Tokarpur declared the administrative center of the rural municipality.

Demographics
At the time of the 2011 Nepal census, Doramba Rural Municipality had a population of 22,773. Of these, 51.9% spoke Nepali, 29.4% Tamang, 7.8% Thangmi, 4.9% Magar, 3.5% Newar, 1.4% Pahari, 0.7% Sherpa and 0.4% other languages as their first language.

In terms of ethnicity/caste, 29.6% were Tamang, 24.9% Magar, 14.9% Newar, 7.9% Thami, 6.9% Hill Brahmin, 5.2% Chhetri, 4.3% Kami, 2.4% Sarki, 1.5% Pahari and 2.4% others.

In terms of religion, 46.3% were Buddhist, 43.2% Hindu, 9.2% Prakriti, 1.0% Christian and 0.3% others.

References

External links
official website of the rural municipality

Rural municipalities in Ramechhap District
Rural municipalities of Nepal established in 2017